Pauler is a surname. Notable people with the surname include:

Ákos Pauler (1876–1933), Hungarian philosopher
Ildefons Pauler (1903–1996), Grand Master of the Teutonic Knights
Tivadar Pauler (1816–1886), Hungarian politician

See also
Paler
Paule (name)